Ian McLean (7 December 1887 – 1978) was an English stage and film actor. He is sometimes credited as Ian Maclean. He played supporting roles in around thirty British films, frequently playing police officers.

Partial filmography

 Brewster's Millions (1935) - McLeod
 Jack of All Trades (1936) - The Fire Raiser
 Mayfair Melody (1937) - Collecchi
 The Street Singer (1937) - Police Inspector
 The Singing Cop (1938) - Zabisti
 Quiet Please (1938) - Woods
 Thistledown (1938) - Rossini
 Simply Terrific (1938) - Foster
 Thank Evans (1938) - (uncredited)
 The Return of Carol Deane (1938) - Prosecution
 Marigold (1938) - James Paton
 Too Dangerous to Live (1939) - Saunders
 The Nursemaid Who Disappeared (1939) - Inspector Pike
 Murder Will Out (1939) - Inspector
 The Arsenal Stadium Mystery (1939) - Sgt. Clinton
 That's the Ticket (1940) - Hercule
 Two for Danger (1940) - Australian
 Sailors Don't Care (1940) - First C.I.D. Man
 Atlantic Ferry (1941) - Capt. Woodruff
 The Young Mr. Pitt (1942) - Dundas
 Headline (1943) - Inspector Dodds
 The Shipbuilders (1943)
 Dreaming (1944) - British General
 The World Owes Me a Living (1945) - Air Minister (uncredited)
 Twilight Hour (1945) - Hemingway
 Here Comes the Sun (1946) - Counsel for the Prosecution
 Appointment with Crime (1946) - Det. Mason
 Calling Paul Temple (1948) - Inspector Crane
 The Story of Shirley Yorke (1948) - Dr. Harris
 Floodtide (1949) - Sir John (final film role)

References

Bibliography
 Mayer, Geoff. Historical Dictionary of Crime Films. Scarecrow Press, 2012.

External links

1887 births
1978 deaths
English male stage actors
English male film actors
People from Greenwich
Male actors from London
20th-century English male actors